Juan Diego Alegría Arango (born 6 June 2002) is a Colombian professional footballer who plays as a forward for Rangers.

Career
On 28 February 2022, Alegría joined Scottish Championship side Partick Thistle on loan from Rangers for the remainder of the 2021–22 season. On 20 July 2022, Alegría then joined Scottish League One side Falkirk on a season long loan deal and was allocated the number 9 shirt for the 2022-23 season. Rangers recalled Alegria from his loan on the 19th of January 2023.

Career statistics

Club

References

2002 births
Living people
Colombian footballers
Colombian expatriate footballers
Colombia youth international footballers
Association football forwards
Kakkonen players
Veikkausliiga players
Deportes Tolima footballers
FC Honka players
Rangers F.C. players
Partick Thistle F.C. players
Falkirk F.C. players
Colombian expatriate sportspeople in Finland
Expatriate footballers in Finland
Colombian expatriate sportspeople in Scotland
Expatriate footballers in Scotland
Lowland Football League players
People from Ibagué